The Ligier JS49 is a sports prototype race car, designed, developed and built by Ligier, conforming to FIA Group CN  regulations, to compete in sports car racing, since 2004.

References 

Sports prototypes
Ligier racing cars